The 2018 Città di Como Challenger was a professional tennis tournament played on clay courts. It was the thirteenth edition of the tournament which was part of the 2018 ATP Challenger Tour. It took place in Como, Italy between 27 August – 2 September 2018.

Singles main-draw entrants

Seeds

 1 Rankings are as of 20 August 2018.

Other entrants
The following players received wildcards into the singles main draw:
  Filippo Baldi
  Alessandro Coppini
  Francesco Forti
  Jannik Sinner

The following player received entry into the singles main draw as an alternate:
  Martin Kližan

The following players received entry from the qualifying draw:
  Facundo Argüello
  Dustin Brown
  Federico Coria
  Gianluca Mager

The following player received entry as a lucky loser:
  Roberto Marcora

Champions

Singles

  Salvatore Caruso def.  Christian Garín 7–5, 6–4.

Doubles

  Andre Begemann /  Dustin Brown def.  Martin Kližan /  Filip Polášek 3–6, 6–4, [10–5].

References

Città di Como Challenger
2018